Üçyol is an underground station on the Fahrettin Altay—Evka 3 Line of the İzmir Metro in Konak. Located beneath İnönü Avenue, just west of Üçyol Square, it is one of the ten original stations of the metro system, opened on 22 May 2000. From 2000 to the 2012, Üçyol was the western terminus of the line. On 29 December 2012, the line was extended two stations westward to Hatay.

Üçyol is planned to be the western terminus of the Üçyol—Çamlıkule Line, which is expected to open by 2022. This line will be automatically operated and is expected to become the second metro line in Turkey, after the M5 line in Istanbul.

Connections
ESHOT operates city bus service on İnönü Avenue.

References

İzmir Metro
Railway stations opened in 2000
2000 establishments in Turkey
Railway stations in İzmir Province
Konak District
Rapid transit stations under construction in Turkey